Harry Hopkins was an American political adviser.

Harry Hopkins may also refer to:
Harry Hopkins (engineer) (1912–1986), New Zealand civil engineer and professor
Harry Hopkins (tank), the tank named for politician
Commander Harry Hopkins who commissioned HMS Satellite (1806)
Harry Hopkins (organised criminal), associate of Saffo the Greek

See also
Henry Hopkins (disambiguation)
Harold Hopkins (disambiguation)